The Dots is an Iranian television sitcom. It was broadcast for the first time by the IRIB in 2003. It was directed by Mehran Modiri, the creator of Pavarchin and Shabhaye Barareh.  The show was famous for Bamshad  and his song "Bivafaie."  It is also noted that The Dots holds the distinction of receiving the most money from advertising of any Iranian show, thanks largely to constant sponsorship by Samsung, which is featured prominently in Mr. Pirdoost's  store.  Many of the actors in The Dots are reused in other Modiri productions.

Plot
The plot centered around Ardal Pashandi (Mehran Modiri), Bamshad Pahnfar (Reza Shafie-Jam), and their wives, Manizhe and Mozhdeh Jaberi (Sahar Valadbeigi).  Ardal and Bamshad often got themselves in sticky situations that they tried to hide from their wives, but they were always found out by the end of each episode.  The show began with Ardal as a bachelor living with his aged father (Yoosef Pashandi) in an apartment building owned by Mr. Pirdoost (Saeed Pirdoost) who lived with his bachelor son Kourosh (Siamak Ansari).  Bamshad Pahnfar and Mozhdeh Jaberi were a young married couple living in the building that often interfered in Ardal's business.  Ardal later meets and falls in love with Mozhdeh's sister, Manizh Jaberi (Sahar Jafari Jozani) and they get married and live in Ardal's apartment with his father.  Manizh is a dentist and has a practice inside her home.  Bamshad and Ardal later go work for Daddy Jaberi (Mohammad-Reza Hedayati), their father-in-law, at his company Manchoolbaf.  The show was similar to The Honeymooners in that it featured two married couples and the funny situations the husbands would get themselves into, as well as having a lovable overweight character.  The final episode featured a crossover cameo by the cast of Pavarchin.

Cast
Reza Shafiei Jam as Bamshad
Mehran Modiri as Ardalan Pashandi, Farhad Barareh and Farhad's Father Shir Farhad Barareh
Siamak Ansari as Kourosh Pirdoost
Mohammad-Reza Hedayati as Daddy
Sahar Valadbeigi as Mozhdeh
Sahar Jafari Jozani as Manijeh
Saeid Pirdoost as Pirdoost
saed hedayati as Saed hedayati
Yousef yousef pashandi as Pashandi dad detective
Sahar dervish zadeh as Sepideh
Sanaz samavati as Behnoosh

References

External links

Iranian comedy television series
2000s Iranian television series
2003 Iranian television series debuts
2004 Iranian television series endings
Islamic Republic of Iran Broadcasting original programming
Persian-language television shows